Camp Galileo began as a Bay Area summer camp founded in Palo Alto, California, USA, by CEO Glen Tripp in circa 2001. Everything that happens for campers is informed by the Galileo Innovation Approach (affectionately known as the “GIA”). Drawing heavily from the innovation process inspired by the Institute of Design at Stanford, Galileo runs an evolving series of programs for kids. The GIA is a distillation of everything kids need to learn to envision and create a better world—the mindset, the knowledge and the process.  

Since its founding, Galileo has served more than 500,000 kids across the Bay Area, Southern California and Illinois with more than 70 locations. In 2012, Galileo became certified as a B-Corporation. In addition, the company founded its Innovation for All initiative which aims to provide full and partial scholarships to kids in the areas it serves who otherwise would not be able to attend camps. In 2019, Galileo offered more than 10,000 scholarships to families in need. 

In April 2020, Galileo was ranked as one of the Bay Area Best Places to Work 2020, marking the organization's eleventh consecutive year on the list by the San Francisco and Silicon Valley Business Times.  

Camp Galileo received criticism in June 2019 for allowing a 5-year-old child to walk away from camp unnoticed at one of its camps. The camp did not realize the child went missing until hours later when the parents of the child arrived for pickup. Since then, Galileo expanded its safety protocols to ensure the unprecedented event did not happen again. 

Due to the global pandemic, Galileo was forced to cancel its traditional in-person camps scheduled for the spring and summer of 2020. Because of the COVID-19 epidemic, Camp Galileo strategically filed for Chapter 11 bankruptcy in May 2020 to reorganize the company with plans to continue operating. In lieu of cash refunds, Galileo offered enrolled families credits to be used for future camp sessions and products, and also launched Camp Galileo Anywhere, a comprehensive set of online classes, resources.

References

External links
Galileo Learning

Galileo